Alsophila acaulis, synonyms Alsophila denticulata and Cyathea hancockii, is a species of tree fern native to the Ryukyu Islands, Japan, Taiwan and Hong Kong. The specific epithet hancockii commemorates William Hancock (1847-1914), who collected numerous plants in Japan, China and Southeast Asia. It grows in forest, on stream banks, and in forest margins at an elevation of about 600 m or higher. , Plants of the World Online treated this species under the name Alsophila denticulata.

Description
The trunk of the Alsophila acaulis  plant is either prostrate or short and erect. Fronds may be bi- or tripinnate and up to 1.5 m in length. Characteristically of this species, the lowest pinnae are usually reduced. The rachis and stipe are glossy, brown to purple-dark brown in colouration, and bear scales and hairs on the upper surface. These scales are brown, linear and have rounded bases. Sori occur in two rows, one on either side of the pinnule midvein, and lack indusia.

Cultivation
Alsophila acaulis has entered cultivation although it is still very rare. This species may survive light frosts, but should ideally be grown in rich humus and under shelter. Plants need to be watered well and provided with a consistent supply moisture.

References

acaulis
Ferns of Asia
Flora of Hong Kong
Flora of Japan
Flora of Taiwan
Flora of the Ryukyu Islands
Garden plants of Asia
Ornamental trees
Plants described in 1909